Sir Arthur Champernowne (c.1524 – 1 April 1578) was an English politician, high sheriff and soldier who lived at Dartington Hall in Devon, England.

Champernowne belonged to a large Anglo-Norman family that originated from Cambernon, in Normandy. Following the Norman Conquest of the 11th century, members of the family acquired estates in Devon.  Their surname was originally spelt Champernon, and Sir Arthur Champernowne has sometimes been referred to by that spelling; he was also known by at least three other surnames: Chamborne, Chapman, and Chamberlain. (These variations may reflect, at least in part, a state of flux in English during the 16th century, including variations in the spelling and usage of surnames by individuals.)

Other members of the Champernowne family were prominent in (royal) court, political and military circles during the 16th century: Arthur Champernowne's aunt Lady Kat Ashley (or Astley; née Champernowne) was governess to Queen Elizabeth I, and Sir Walter Raleigh and Sir Humphrey Gilbert were his nephews.

Champernowne is sometimes confused with several relatives also christened Arthur, especially Sir Arthur Champernowne (also Champernon; born c. 1562), an emissary of Elizabeth I during the 1580s.

Biography
Champernowne was the second son of Sir Philip Champernowne (died 1545) of Modbury, Devon, by his wife Katherine Carew, daughter of Sir Edmund Carew, Knight, of Mohuns Ottery.  When England was alerted to a possible invasion, he served in the English army at the Siege of Boulougne.

In 1549, Champernowne helped subdue a rebellion that sought to have the Latin Bible restored to a position of authority over the English-language version.  The rebellion began in Cornwall, where the Cornish language was still widely spoken and English was regarded as a foreign language.  He was knighted on 10 November 1549 for his part in crushing the western rebellion.

Champernowne was an ardent protestant.  He flirted with the conspiracy of cousin, Sir Peter Carew to support the claim of Lady Jane Grey, but wisely settled for accepting Mary Tudor.  Champernowne was installed as Member of Parliament for Barnstaple in 1552 (replacing the elected MP, Sir James Wilford, who had died).

He spent early 1554 in the Tower, but was released on recognizance of a fine of £1000, and allowed to return to Devon.  Although excluded from office by the Marian regime, he was chosen a local JP in 1555.  They elected him in turn for Plympton Erle in 1555, Plymouth in 1559 and Totnes in 1563.

Family
In 1546 Sir Arthur married Mary, widow of Sir George Carew, and daughter of Henry Norris (d. 1536), who had been implicated in the fall of Anne Boleyn and was beheaded. The couple had five sons and a daughter:
Gawen (d. 1592), married Roberte de Montgomery, daughter of Comte Gabriel de Montgomery and Isabel de la Touche.
Philip
Charles
George
Edward
Elizabeth, who married Sir Edward Seymour, 1st Baronet

In 1554 he exchanged with Thomas Aylworth, Lord of Dartington, the mansion house at Polsoe, Exeter for the Dartington estate, which contained the medieval Dartington Hall.  By 1560 the construction of a new Elizabethan front on the foundation of the older buildings was underway and this continued for several years. His descendants continued to live in Dartington Hall until it became partly derelict and was sold in 1925.

Official Posts:
1552 - MP for Barnstaple
1555 – MP for Plympton
1559 - MP for Plymouth
1559 – Sheriff of Devon
1562 – Vice-Admiral of the Devon Coasts, a post he held for life.
1563 – MP for Totnes.

On the accession of Elizabeth I he developed his maritime interests:  from being Sheriff of Devon in 1559–60, he put to sea.  As vice-admiral appointed in 1563, his service against French pirates was noted:  constant harassment along the western approaches.  However, from time to time he co-operated with the privateers of Jeanne d'Albret, Queen of Navarre, against Catholic Spain.  In December 1568, many of these ships were driven up the channel and into Southampton and Portsmouth to be received by Sir Arthur and Edward Horsey, in the name of the Queen of England.  In 1568 he had organised the robbery of the Spanish treasure fleet which was taking money to the Duke of Alva, Regent of the Netherlands. Champernowne personally delivered 64 boxes of treasure weighing some 8 tonnes safely to the tower of London, worth some 2 million reales. Over half of the money was used by Queen Elizabeth to fund her navy, the remainder she sent on to Amsterdam.

He was a prominent supporter of protestantism and in 1572, his son Gawen married the daughter of Gabriel, Count of Montgomery, a Huguenot. The Count, whose immediate forebears were Scots, was Captain of the Scots Guards. Champernowne was at Dwercy, France for the marriage and reported back to Lord Burghley on the conditions in France.  Following the massacre of St Bartholomew's Eve, the Count escaped France and was given refuge at Dartington Hall.  Champernowne wrote to Queen Elizabeth proposing the raising of an army to provide relief for the protestants in France.

In 1574 he led a relief expedition which went spectacularly wrong.  Montgomery had already been captured and executed in Normandy, and the English fleet could only aid the Huguenot captains of La Rochelle.  Sir Arthur's daughter Elizabeth married Sir Edward Seymour of Berry Pomeroy in 1576.  Champernowne was continuing to support the naval exploits against France, when he wrote his will in March 1578.  He died at Dartington Hall on 1 April.

References

Sources

External links
 

1524 births
1578 deaths
Members of the Parliament of England (pre-1707) for Totnes
English admirals
English knights
English MPs 1547–1552
English MPs 1555
English MPs 1559
English MPs 1563–1567
Members of the Parliament of England (pre-1707) for Barnstaple
Members of the Parliament of England for Plymouth
Members of the Parliament of England for Plympton Erle